Petr Gabriel (born 17 May 1973) is a Czech former professional footballer who played as a defender. He played for the Czech Republic national team, participating at the Euro 2000. At club level Gabriel played more than 200 matches in the Gambrinus liga.

International career
Gabriel represented the Czech Republic national team at the Euro 2000. In the decisive group stage match against France, an attempted backpass from Gabriel to his goalkeeper was picked up by Thierry Henry, who scored. The Czech Republic lost 2–1 and ended its participation in the tournament after the group stage despite a 2–0 victory in its last match against Denmark.

Personal life
Gabriel was born in Prague. He has two sons, Šimon and Adam, who are professional footballers.

International goal 
Scores and results list Czech Republic's goal tally first.

References

External links
 
 
 
 

Living people
1973 births
Czech footballers
Footballers from Prague
Association football defenders
Czech Republic international footballers
Czech Republic under-21 international footballers
UEFA Euro 2000 players
Czech First League players
Bundesliga players
2. Bundesliga players
AC Sparta Prague players
FK Viktoria Žižkov players
FK Teplice players
1. FC Kaiserslautern players
Arminia Bielefeld players
Czech expatriate footballers
Czech expatriate sportspeople in Germany
Expatriate footballers in Germany